Chloropeta was a genus of Acrocephalidae warblers; formerly, they were placed in the paraphyletic "Old World warblers".  Now the papyrus yellow warbler is placed in its monotypic genus Calamonastides, with the others placed in the genus Iduna.

It contained the following species:
 Papyrus yellow warbler (Chloropeta gracilirostris)
 African yellow warbler (Chloropeta natalensis)
 Mountain yellow warbler (Chloropeta similis)

References
 del Hoyo, J.; Elliot, A. & Christie D. (editors). (2006). Handbook of the Birds of the World. Volume 11: Old World Flycatchers to Old World Warblers. Lynx Edicions. .

Acrocephalidae
Bird genera
Taxonomy articles created by Polbot
Obsolete bird taxa